Boris Borisovich Rotenberg (born 19 May 1986) is a former professional footballer who played as a right-back. Born in Russia, he made one appearance for the Finland national team in 2015.

Biography 
His father, Boris Romanovich Rotenberg, is an oligarch who was listed by Forbes magazine as the 100th wealthiest person in Russia in 2010, with a net worth of US$700m. His father has been a friend of the Russian president Vladimir Putin since the 1960s, when they took judo lessons together. Rotenberg's uncle Arkady Rotenberg was the 99th wealthiest in Russia, according to the same list. His maternal grandfather was a Ingrian Finn.

In July 2008, Boris Rotenberg and a fellow Jewish Russian, Yakov Ehrlich, joined the Israeli club, Hapoel Petah Tikva on trial. The club was interested in the services of both men, since they are Jewish and would not count as foreigners.

He was called up for Finland national team in June 2015, aged 29, for the first time.

In December 2018, he injured his anterior cruciate ligament.

On 7 June 2021, he extended his contract with FC Lokomotiv Moscow until 31 December 2021. On 30 December 2021, he extended it once again until the end of the 2021–22 season, despite not playing for three years at that point due to injuries. Rotenberg left Lokomotiv on 30 May 2022.

Criticism 
Rotenberg's footballing skills were called into question by several media outlets in Russia, whereas club officials and head coaches of Dynamo, Rostov, and Lokomotiv were accused of bowing to pressure from his wealthy and influential family, seeking his at least occasional inclusion in team's lineup. The player himself, however, has been praised for his hard work at training sessions, as well as for keeping a low profile despite his family background.

Career statistics

Club

International

Honours 
Lokomotiv Moscow
Russian Premier League: 2017–18
Russian Cup: 2016–17, 2018–19

References

External links 
 
 Article about Rotenberg at compromat.ru 

1986 births
Living people
Footballers from Saint Petersburg
Finnish footballers
Finland international footballers
Russian footballers
Jewish footballers
Finnish Jews
Russian Jews
Finnish people of Russian-Jewish descent
Russian people of Finnish descent
Expatriate footballers in Russia
Finnish expatriate footballers
Finnish expatriate sportspeople in Russia
Association football defenders
FC Jokerit players
FC Spartak Vladikavkaz players
FC Dynamo Moscow players
FC Khimki players
FC Kuban Krasnodar players
FC Saturn Ramenskoye players
FC Shinnik Yaroslavl players
Olympiakos Nicosia players
FC Rostov players
FC Lokomotiv Moscow players
Russian Premier League players
Cypriot First Division players
Russian emigrants to Finland
Klubi 04 players
FC Zenit Saint Petersburg players
Naturalized citizens of Finland
People of Ingrian Finnish descent